Littorella uniflora (vernacular name: (American) shoreweed) is a species of aquatic flowering plant native to the Azores, Morocco, most of Europe excluding the dry southeast, Iceland, and the Faroes. It prefers to live mostly submerged in nutrient-poor freshwater habitats. When submerged, it draws CO2 mostly through its roots and uses a mix of crassulacean acid metabolism (CAM) and C3 carbon fixation for photosynthesis. If the water level drops and exposes the roots, it ceases using CAM.

References

Plantaginaceae
Freshwater plants
Plants described in 1864